The BAFTA Award for Best Direction, formerly known as David Lean Award for Achievement in Direction, is a British Academy Film Award presented annually by the British Academy of Film and Television Arts (BAFTA) to a film director for a specific film.

History
The award was originally known as David Lean Award for Achievement in Direction, in honour of British director David Lean.

There are no records showing any nominations, or a winner, for this award at the 39th British Academy Film Awards, presented in 1986 for films released in 1985.

Winners and nominees
John Schlesinger, Roman Polanski, Woody Allen, Alan Parker, Louis Malle, Joel Coen, Peter Weir, Ang Lee, and Alfonso Cuarón tie for the most wins in this category, with two each. Martin Scorsese holds the record for most nominations, with ten.

1960s

1970s

1980s

1990s

2000s

2010s

2020s

Multiple wins (2 or more)
Woody Allen
Alan Parker
John Schlesinger
Louis Malle
Peter Weir
Ang Lee
Roman Polanski
Joel Coen
Alfonso Cuarón

Multiple nominations 
Martin Scorsese - 10 nominations
Steven Spielberg - 6 nominations
Richard Attenborough - 5 nominations
Alan Parker - 5 nominations
Woody Allen - 4 nominations
Robert Altman - 4 nominations
James Ivory - 4 nominations
Ang Lee - 4 nominations
Quentin Tarantino - 4 nominations

See also
 Academy Award for Best Director
 Independent Spirit Award for Best Director
 Golden Globe Award for Best Director
 Critics' Choice Movie Award for Best Director
 Directors Guild of America Award for Outstanding Directing – Feature Film

References

British Academy Film Awards